The first USS Nantahala (ID-3519) was a United States Navy cargo ship in commission from 1918 to 1919.

Construction, acquisition, and commissioning 
Nantahala was constructed as the commercial single-screw cargo ship SS Wautahala for the United States Shipping Board by the Western Pipe and Steel Company at San Francisco, California. Later renamed SS Nantahala, she was launched on 4 July 1918. Transferred to the U.S. Navy on 16 November 1918, she was assigned the naval registry identification number 3519 and commissioned the same day as USS Nantahala (ID-3519).

Operational history 
Assigned to the Naval Overseas Transportation Service, Nantahala loaded a cargo of flour and departed the United States West Coast on 5 December 1918 bound for New York City, where she arrived on 31 December 1918. Assigned to duty as a food relief ship, she got underway for the Mediterranean Sea on 9 January 1919 and reached Fiume in mid-February 1919 with her cargo of flour and foodstuffs, which she delivered to help in the relief of starvation in Eastern Europe in the aftermath of World War I.

Nantahala operated in the Adriatic Sea and the central Mediterranean during the next month, then steamed to Gibraltar, from which she left for New York City, where she arrived on 10 April 1919.

Decommissioning and disposal 
Nantahala was decommissioned at New York City on 17 April 1919, and the Navy returned her to the U.S. Shipping Board on the 30 April 1919. Once again SS Nantahala, she remained in Shipping Board custody until scrapped at Baltimore, Maryland, in 1929.

References 

Department of the Navy: Naval Historical Center Online Library of Selected Images: Civilian Ships: Nantahala (Freighter, 1918). Originally named Wautahala. Served as USS Nantahala (ID # 3519) in 1918–1919
NavSource Online: Section Patrol Craft Photo Archive: Nantahala (ID 3519)

External links 
 Photo gallery at navsource.org
 Photo gallery at U.S. Navy History and Heritage Command

 

Design 1019 ships
Design 1019 ships of the United States Navy
Auxiliary ships of the United States Navy
Ships built in San Francisco
1918 ships